The Singapore Masters was a professional invitational snooker tournament held for two editions in Singapore. Sponsored by Camus, both tournaments were won by Terry Griffiths and Steve Davis respectively.

Winners

References

Snooker non-ranking competitions
Recurring sporting events established in 1984
Recurring sporting events disestablished in 1985
Sport in Singapore
Defunct snooker competitions
1984 establishments in Singapore
1985 disestablishments in Singapore